Kishore ([ˈraːm kɪʃoːr]) may refer to:

 Kishore (name), an Indian given name and surname
 Captain Kishore, a 1940 Bollywood film
 K for Kishore, a 2007–2008 Indian television singing contest 
 Kishore Bangla, Bengali-language juvenile weekly newspaper 
 Amdanga Jugal Kishore Mahavidyalaya, a college in West Bengal, India
 Gour Kishore Ghosh metro station of the Kolkata Metro 
 Dum Dum Kishore Bharati High School in Kolkata, India
 Kishore Bharati Krirangan, a multipurpose stadium in Kolkata, India 
 Kishore Bharati Bhagini Nivedita (Co-ed) College in Behala, West Bengal, India
 Kishore Kala Mandir, a private building in Beohari city, India 
 Kishore Vaigyanik Protsahan Yojana (English: Young Scientist Incentive Plan), an Indian government scholarship program 
 Maharaja Harendra Kishore Public Library in Bettiah, Bihar, India 
 Nand Kishore Singh Degree College in Uttar Pradesh, India

See also 
 Kishor